The Northern Honduras mangroves form an ecoregion in the mangroves biome, as defined by the World Wildlife Fund. This ecoregion stretches along most of the Caribbean coast of Honduras, up to the east of Amatique Bay in Guatemala. It covers an area of 1036 km2.
The ecoregion is threatened by the expansion of agriculture and livestock production.

References

Mangrove ecoregions
Ecoregions of Guatemala
Ecoregions of Honduras

Ecoregions of Central America
Neotropical ecoregions